The "Sleepy Lagoon murder" was the name that Los Angeles newspapers used to describe the 1942 death of José Gallardo Díaz, who was discovered unconscious and dying near a swimming hole (known as the Sleepy Lagoon) with two stab wounds and a broken finger in Commerce, California, United States, on the morning of August 3. Earlier, Díaz was seen at a party for Eleanor Delgadillo Coronado where he left afterwards with two friends, Luis "Cito" Vargas and Andrew Torres. He was then confronted by a group of young men from the 38th street neighborhood, who came to the party seeking revenge for an earlier beating of some of their friends.

Díaz was taken by ambulance to Los Angeles County General Hospital, where he died shortly afterwards without regaining consciousness. The hospital's autopsy showed that he was inebriated from the party and had a fracture at the base of his skull. This might have been caused by repeated falls or an automobile accident. The cause of Díaz's death remains disputed to this day. However, the Los Angeles Police Department (LAPD) was quick to arrest seventeen Mexican-American youthsJack Melendez, Victor Thompson, Angel Padilla, John Y. Matuz, Ysmael Parra (Smiles), Henry Leyva, Gus Zamora, Manuel Reyes, Robert Telles, Manuel Delgado, Jose Ruiz (Chepe), Victor Segobia, and Henry Ynostrozaas suspects. Despite insufficient evidence, the young men were held in prison, without bail, on charges of murder.

The trial ended on January 13, 1943, under the supervision of Judge Charles W. Fricke. Twelve of the defendants were convicted of second degree murder and sentenced to serve time in San Quentin Prison. The rest were charged with lesser offenses and incarcerated in the Los Angeles County Jail. The convictions were reversed on appeal in 1944. The case is considered a precursor to the Zoot Suit Riots of 1943.

Sleepy Lagoon was a reservoir beside the Los Angeles River that was frequented by Mexican-Americans. Its name came from the popular song "Sleepy Lagoon", which was recorded in 1942 by big band leader and trumpeter Harry James. The reservoir was located near the city of Maywood at approximately what is now 5400 Lindbergh Lane in Bell. The current address has also been given as approximately 5500 Slauson Avenue.

Background
Beginning in the early 1930s and exacerbated by the Great Depression, approximately 1 million Mexican immigrants and native-born Americans of Mexican descent were forced to leave the United States for Mexico during Mexican Repatriation. Repatriation occurred across many different states, with an estimated 75,000 people forced from Southern California to Mexico during this period. An estimated 60% of them were U.S. citizen minors due to birthright citizenship. In February 1942, the U.S. government interned Japanese Americans from the West Coast, after classifying them as security threats following the United States' entry into World War II. As society mobilized for war, thousands of Mexican citizens under the Bracero program arrived to Los Angeles for agricultural jobs, as did hundreds of thousands of Black southerners during the Second Great Migration to the city for defense-related jobs such as munitions factories and shipyards. The rapid influx of laborers from Mexico and defense workers of ethnic backgrounds from all across the country into Los Angeles heightened racial tensions in the city. A grand jury, headed by E. Duran Ayres, was appointed by the Los Angeles City Council to investigate an alleged "Mexican crime wave". At this time, the Zoot Suit was becoming a large trend for Mexican-American women as a sign of new-wave feminism, as a way to express themselves, to break out of the normal clothing styles of the time and to fight against the boring and somber slum lifestyle by using bright, eccentric, and flamboyant colors. At the time, this style was harshly attacked for excessive use of fabric, which many Americans claimed was meant to be rationed out for the war effort.

Death
The morning of August 2, 1942, José Gallardo Díaz was found unconscious and later died in the hospital. The autopsy revealed that Díaz was intoxicated and had blunt head trauma as well as multiple stab wounds, but ultimately they could not determine a cause of death. Despite the unclear cause of death, 20-year-old Henry Leyvas and 24 members of what the media termed "the 38th Street gang" were arrested for allegedly murdering Díaz. They suspected that rival Pachuco gang fights were the cause of Díaz's death.

In response to the alleged murder, the media began a campaign calling for action against "zoot suiters". On August 10, police conducted a roundup of 600 Latinos who were charged with suspicion of assault, armed robbery, and related offenses; 175 were eventually held for various crimes. Due to this round-up of "Zoot Suiters", many families in the community began putting curfews in place to protect those that they cared about from the increasing police presence.

Criminal trial

The resulting criminal trial is now generally viewed as lacking in the fundamental requirements of due process. Seventeen Latino youths were indicted on the murder charges and placed on trial.  The seventeen defendants were to be subject to a verdict regarding the death of Jose Diaz. Twelve of these people were declared guilty for the murder of Diaz and the other five were found guilty of assault. Ysmael Parra was one of the seventeen people who were convicted for the death of Jose Diaz. Parra was sentenced to serve five years to life in prison and was convicted with intent to commit murder. Along with Parra, Henry Ynostroza, Gus Zammora, Jack Melendez, Victor Thompson,  Manuel Reyes, Angel Padilla, Robert Telles, Manuel Delgado and John Matuz all received a five to life in prison after their conviction. Ruiz, Leyvas, and Telles were immediately sentenced to life in prison for first degree murder. Many people fought against these convictions on the basis that there was a racial motivation behind the decisions made for their convictions as the media had been portraying, not only the defendants as criminals, but people of color and Latinos as well.  

The courtroom was small and, during the trial, the defendants were not allowed to sit near, or to communicate with, their attorneys. None of those charged were permitted to change their clothes during the trial by order of Judge Fricke at the request of the district attorney on the grounds that the jury should see the defendants in the zoot suits that were "obviously" worn only by "hoodlums". Every time a name was mentioned by a witness or the district attorney, regardless of how damning the statement was, the named defendant was required to stand up.  Judge Fricke also permitted the chief of the Foreign Relations Bureau of the Los Angeles sheriff's office, E. Duran Ayres, to testify as an "expert witness" that Mexicans as a community had a "blood-thirst" and a "biological predisposition" to crime and killing, citing the culture of human sacrifice practiced by their Aztec ancestors.

Activist involvement
The Sleepy Lagoon Defense Committee (SLDC) was a community organization made up of Los Angeles community members and activists who came together to support the defendants. The SLDC was also known as The Citizens' Committee for the Defense of Mexican-American Youth. During the time of the trials many activists criticized the way that Judge Fricke went about the case as a result of the manner in which the case was handled, thus many supported the defendants. Many of the supporters of the defendants turned and created/joined the Sleepy Lagoon Defense Committee. The committee was labeled a Communist front organization by the California state legislature's Joint Fact-Finding Committee on Un-American Activities chaired by Jack Tenney. Actor Anthony Quinn writes that he began raising money for the defense after his mother urged him to "remember the eggs" they had been given by a mother of one of the accused defendants during a time of poverty.  He writes of enlisting the help of Orson Welles and Eleanor Roosevelt, and being branded a communist as a result, almost costing him his career. Some SLDC members included: Alice McGrath, Josefina Fierro de Bright, Josefa Fierro, Maria Alvez, Luisa Moreno, Dorothy Healey, LaRue McCormick, Lupe Leyvas, Henry Leyvas, Doc Johnson, Frank Lopez, Bert Corona, and Gray Bemis. The SLDC's mission was to mount a civil rights crusade so that these 12 Mexican-American defendants could have an unbiased trial. The SLDC  utilized their contacts with influential community members to promote their cause and for fund-raising purposes to be able to support their cause. After Judge Fricke's verdict in January, the Mexican-American youths were imprisoned without evidence and because they were "Mexican and dangerous", ipso facto. The Mexican American community was outraged and several attorneys challenged Judge Fricke's decisions: George Shibley, Robert Kenny, Clore Ware, Ben Margolis, John McTernan, Carey McWilliams, and several others. Together they hoped to remind the European American society that minorities had the right to testify in court and have impartial jury trials. McWilliams noted that a few months earlier over 120,000 Japanese Americans were detained and interned in detention camps, and later argued that there were common links between the Japanese-American internment and the anti-Mexican response in the Sleepy Lagoon case.

By the time that the defendants began serving their convictions, there was already an uproar in how young Mexican Americans were being perceived. Rumors later began to circulate that gang members had attacked many US Navy men. As a result many went around raiding Latino communities and began attacking them in retribution. People who were attacked were people of color or people who wore zoot suits.  These attacks later became known as the Zoot Suit Riots. From 1943 through 1944, the state anti-Communist Tenney Committee subpoenaed and investigated the members of the Defense Committee in an attempt to uncover Communist ties.

Reversal
In October 1944, the state Court of Appeals unanimously decided the evidence was not sufficient to sustain a guilty verdict.  It reversed the 12 defendants' convictions in People v Zammora 66 Cal.App.2d 166. The appeals court also criticized the trial judge for his bias in and mishandling of the case. After the Zoot Suit Riots, the convictions of the seventeen people were overturned. There was a lack of evidence to convict the defendants to begin with and it was Diaz's autopsy report that showed that he was highly inebriated and received trauma to the head, which likely could have been caused by his own doing. However, the convictions did not immediately get overturned. It took the efforts of the SLDC and time in order for the government to finally reverse the initial convictions. The SLDC constantly pushed the idea that the government was an attack on young Mexican Americans and emphasized that these injustices could be fought. Not only did they do this, but they also did what they could in order to try and reverse the views that people had on young Mexican Americans.

Cultural references
 The 1979 play Zoot Suit and the 1981 movie of the same name are loosely based on events surrounding the murder trial. 
 In James Ellroy's novel The Big Nowhere, the Sleepy Lagoon murder plays a major role in the story.

See also
 East Los Angeles, California
 History of the Mexican Americans in Los Angeles
 List of unsolved deaths

References

Further reading
McWilliams, Carey, "Second Thoughts", The Nation, April 7, 1979
Servin, Manuel,  The Mexican-Americans: An Awakening Minority.  (1970) 
McGrath (Alice Greenfield) Papers, Southern California Library for Social Studies and Research, Los Angeles, California

External links
McGrath (Alice Greenfield) Papers, Southern California Library for Social Studies and Research, Los Angeles, California
Sleepy Lagoon Website 
 Pagán, Eduardo Obregón   Murder at the Sleepy Lagoon Zoot Suits, Race, and Riot in Wartime L.A. University of North Carolina Press (2003)
 Sleepy Lagoon Defense Committee. (1943).  The Sleepy Lagoon Case.  Online Archive of California.
 Sleepy Lagoon Defense Committee. (1944). This is the story of a crime.  The Charles E. Young Research Library, UCLA, via Calisphere.
 Sleepy Lagoon Defense Committee Records (Collection 107). UCLA Library Special Collections, Charles E. Young Research Library, UCLA. 
 UCLA Sleepy Lagoon Symposium (2005)
 The Sleepy Lagoon Case: Constitutional Rights, and the Struggle for Democracy. A commemorative symposium, May 20–21, 2005, UCLA
 PBS special
 Retrieved 02-06-2015

History of Los Angeles County, California
Commerce, California
Mexican-American history
Murdered Mexican Americans
1942 in California
1942 murders in the United States
History of racism in California
Unsolved murders in the United States